Ruth Amelia Ocumárez y Apataño (born 10 December 1983, in Santo Domingo) is a Dominican beauty queen, actress, and model. Born and raised in Santo Domingo, Ocumárez became a celebrity in her nation by becoming the first woman of predominantly African heritage to represent the Dominican Republic at Miss Universe. 

Due to her outstanding dark complexion and “bubbly” personality, she was given the nickname "La Diosa de Ébano" (English: The Ebony Goddess) by the Dominican public and press along with the general expectation of assured placement on coronation night.

The Award of Ruth Ocumarez
At the height of Miss Universe 2002 pageant, Ocumárez was predicted by many to be place as a semi-finalist.

To the great surprise of many pageant connoisseurs, Ocumarez did not place, causing many internet  bloggers to coin the pageant term the Ruth Ocumárez Award to signify a pageant contestant who seems guaranteed to be a finalist, but does not make the maximum entry at the initial placement selections of the pageant. 

Accordingly, pageant candidates who gain placement or “special awards” (i.e. Miss Photogenic, Miss Friendship, Miss Congeniality, Best in Swimsuit, Best in Long Gown) do not classify for this award.

Career
After her reign was over, Ocumárez entered the world of modeling and appeared in many Dominican, European, and Puerto Rican periodicals. She also branched out into acting, starring in the Dominican film Perico Ripiao. Besides her work in film, Ocumárez also has experience as a television hostess on Puerto Rican television.

It was reported in 2007 that Ocumárez had become engaged to flamboyant entertainment personality Sixto Nolasco. Nolasco, who was interviewed by journalist Carmen Jovet declared that he was "tired of being gay," and that he intends to start a family with his new wife. To date, there has been no formal announcement of the proposed nuptials.

References

External links 
 
 
 
 Fashion Shoot
 Short Fashion Profile
 Fashion profile

1983 births
Dominican Republic beauty pageant winners
Dominican Republic female models
Living people
Miss Dominican Republic
Miss Universe 2002 contestants
People from Santo Domingo
Afro-Dominican (Dominican Republic)